Il re pastore (The Shepherd King) is an opera by the composer Christoph Willibald Gluck. It takes the form of a dramma per musica in three acts. The Italian-language libretto is by Pietro Metastasio. The opera premiered on 8 December 1756 at the Burgtheater, Vienna.

Roles

Sources
Holden, Amanda The Viking Opera Guide (Viking, 1993), page 373.
Gluck Gesamtausgabe Il re pastore

1756 operas
Italian-language operas
Operas by Christoph Willibald Gluck
Opera world premieres at the Burgtheater
Operas